Georges Gauthier-Lafond (16 October 1914 – 30 September 1992) was a French sports shooter. He competed in the 50 m rifle event at the 1948 Summer Olympics.

References

External links
 

1914 births
1992 deaths
French male sport shooters
Olympic shooters of France
Shooters at the 1948 Summer Olympics
Place of birth missing
20th-century French people